General Ennis may refer to:

Michael E. Ennis (fl. 1970s–2000s), U.S. Marine Corps major general
William Ennis (1841–1938), U.S. Army brigadier general
William P. Ennis (1904–1989), U.S. Army lieutenant general
William Peirce Ennis (1878–1968), U.S. Army brigadier general

See also
Roger Enos (1729–1808), Vermont Militia major general in the American Revolutionary War